John Daniel O'Brien (17 August 1898 – 30 May 1966) was an Australian rules footballer who played with Essendon and Footscray in the Victorian Football League (VFL).

Football

He played as a half-forward for Footscray for the next four seasons and was part of two premierships.

In 1925, when Footscray joined the VFL, O'Brien was unable to remain with the club due to his suspension from the VFL for leaving Essendon without a clearance, and he consequently played for country and junior clubs for the three-year period of his disqualification from 1925 until 1927.

O'Brien successfully sued Footscray for £70 in potential match payments that he missed in 1925 and 1926 as a result of the suspension, owing to a clause to that effect in his original agreement with Footscray which covered the eventuality of the club joining the VFL.

After his suspension ended, he played five VFL matches for Footscray in 1928 before transferring to Coburg in the VFA later in the season.

He then crossed to Williamstown where he played 35 games and kicked 84 goals and was leading goalkicker at the Club in 1929 with 32 goals and in 1930 with 50 goals when O'Brien was captain-coach. He was replaced as coach in 1931 and then transferred to Newport early in the season. His younger brother, Wally O'Brien, also played at Williamstown in the same period. O'Brien had been wounded in Egypt during World War I and eventually passed away in Heidelberg Repatriation Hospital in May, 1966, at the age of 67.

Military service
Having enlisted on 20 July 1917, he served overseas in the First AIF with the 5th Australian Infantry Battalion.

Death
He died at the Heidelberg Repatriation Hospital, in Heidelberg, Victoria, on 30 May 1966.

Notes

References
 
 First World War Nominal Roll: Private John Daniel O'Brien (4898), collection of the Australian War Memorial.
 First World War Embarkation Roll: Private John Daniel O'Brien (4898), collection of the Australian War Memorial.
 [https://recordsearch.naa.gov.au/SearchNRetrieve/NAAMedia/ViewPDF.aspx?B=7991480&D=D First World War Service Record: Private John Daniel O'Brien (4898), "National Archives of Australia.]

 External links 
 		
 
 Jack D. O'Brien at The VFA Project''.

1898 births
1966 deaths
Australian rules footballers from Victoria (Australia)
Essendon Football Club players
Western Bulldogs players
Footscray Football Club (VFA) players
Yarrawonga Football Club players
Coburg Football Club players
Williamstown Football Club players
Williamstown Football Club coaches